Couch surfing (sofa surfing) is the practice of temporarily staying in another person's home

Couch surfing, couchsurfer, couch-surf, or variation, can also refer to:

CouchSurfing, a website designed to help arrange couch surfing
Couch Surfin USA, a 2015 EP by the band YJY

"Couch Surfer", a 1998 song by Bran Van 3000 off the album Glee (Bran Van 3000 album)
"Couch Surfer", a 2011 song by Ducktails off the album Killin the Vibe
The Couchsurfer, a VR nominated at the 2018 11th Transgender Erotica Awards
Couch Surfer, Lover (EP), a 2019 extended play by Emily Blue and Tara Terra, see Emily Blue discography

See also

Sofa surfing (disambiguation)
 Couch (disambiguation)
 Surfing (disambiguation)
 Surfer (disambiguation)
 Surf (disambiguation)
 Sofa (disambiguation)